Rochia conus, common name the cone top shell, is a species of sea snail, a marine gastropod mollusk in the family Tegulidae.

Description
The height of the shell varies between 45 mm and 70 mm, its diameter between 45 mm and 60 mm. The solid, thick shell has a conic-pyramidal shape. Its, axis is imperforate but appears sub-umbilicate. It is white, longitudinally flammulated with bright red. The spire is conic. The apex is acute. The 10 whorls are spirally encircled by numerous (about 10 on upper surface) beaded lirae, which are separated by superficial interstices. Above the sutures there is a series of short folds or knobs which usually become obsolescent upon the periphery of the body whorl. The body whorl is obtuse at the periphery, nearly flat below, indented around the false umbilicus, obsoletely concentrically lirate, the lirae about 9 in number, red and white articulated, interstices white. The aperture is transversely rhomboidal, somewhat rounded. The columella is nearly vertically descending, subdentate at base, above with a profoundly entering spiral fold. The parietal wall bears a heavy transparent callus, which is excavated around the axis.

Distribution
This marine species occurs in the Red Sea, off the Philippines, Indo-Mamaysia, off Vietnam, New Caledonia and New South Wales, Australia.

References

 Chemnitz, J.H. 1781. Neues systematisches Conchylien - Cabinet. Nürnberg : G.N. Raspe Vol. 5 1–324, pls 160–193.
 Perry, G. 1810. Arcana; or The Museum of Natural History: containing the most recent discovered objects. London : George Smeeton pl. I-XLVIII.
 Perry, G. 1811. Conchology, or the natural history of shells containing a new arrangement of the genera and species, illustrated by coloured engravings, executed from the natural specimens and including the latest discoveries. London : W. Miller 4 pp., 62 pls. [pl. 47, fig. 3] (as Trochus elatus, misidentification cf. Hedley's notes)
 Quoy, J.M.C. & Gaimard, J.P. 1835. Voyage de découvertes de l'Astrolabe, exécuté par ordre du Roi, pendant les années 1826-1829. Paris : J. Tastu 954 pp., atlas, 107 pls.
 Deshayes, G.P. 1843. Histoire naturelle des animaux sans vertèbres. Paris : J.B. Baillière Vol. 9 728 pp. [139] (as Trochus elatus, misidentification cf. Hedley's notes)
 Philippi, R.A. 1848. Trochidae. pp. 41-72 in Küster, H.C. (ed). Systematisches Conchylien-Cabinet von Martini und Chemnitz. Nürnberg : Bauer & Raspe Vol. II.
 Reeve, L.A. 1862. Monograph of the genus Trochus. pls 1-16 in Reeve, L.A. (ed). Conchologia Iconica. London : L. Reeve & Co. Vol. 13.
 Fischer, P. 1875. Genres Calcar, Trochus, Xenophora, Tectarius et Risella. pp. 1-96 in Keiner, L.C. (ed.). Spécies general et iconographie des coquilles vivantes. Paris : J.B. Baillière Vol. 11
 Mathews, G.M. & Iredale, T. 1912. "Perry's Arcana" - an overlooked work. Victorian Naturalist 29: 7-16 
 Hedley, C. 1918. A checklist of the marine fauna of New South Wales. Part 1. Journal and Proceedings of the Royal Society of New South Wales 51: M1-M120
 Habe, T. 1964. Shells of the Western Pacific in color. Osaka : Hoikusha Vol. 2 233 pp., 66 pls.
 MacDonald & Co (1979). The MacDonald Encyclopedia of Shells. MacDonald & Co. London & Sydney
 Hickman, C.S. & McLean, J.H. 1990. Systematic revision and suprageneric classification of trochacean gastropods. Natural History Museum of Los Angeles County. Science Series 35: i-vi, 1-169 
 Springsteen, F.J. & Leobrera, F.M. 1986. Shells of the Philippines. Manila : Carfel Seashell Museum 377 pp., 100 pls
 Ponder, W.F. & Middelfart, P.U. 2010.  OBIS 2010.

External links
 
 Williams, S. T. (2012). Advances in molecular systematics of the vetigastropod superfamily Trochoidea. Zoologica Scripta. 41(6): 571-595

conus
Gastropods described in 1791